The Aerobic Gymnastics World Championships are the World Championships for aerobic gymnastics. They have been held since 1995.

Championships

Senior

Age Group
FIG Aerobic Gymnastics World Age Group Competitions :

All-time medal table
 Last updated after the 2022 Aerobic Gymnastics World Championships; results include team competition events.

References

 
Aerobic gymnastics competitions
Recurring sporting events established in 1995